This lecture, named in memory of Keith R. Porter, is presented to an eminent cell biologist each year at the ASCB Annual Meeting. The ASCB Program Committee and the ASCB President recommend the Porter Lecturer to the Porter Endowment each year.

Lecturers
Source: ASCB

See also

 List of biology awards

References

American Society for Cell Biology
Biology awards
American awards
Awards established in 1982
1982 establishments in the United States